Praunus flexuosus, known as the chameleon shrimp, is a species of opossum shrimp found in European waters. It lives in shallow water and tolerates a wide range of salinities. It is found from northern France to the Baltic Sea, and was introduced to North America in the mid 20th century.

Description
Praunus flexuosus is a long, slender animal, with a pronounced bend in the abdomen. Its colouration is highly variable, ranging from brown or red to green, which accounts for its common name of "chamaeleon shrimp".

Praunus flexuosus is very similar to the related species P. neglectus. The two can be differentiated by the following characters:

Taxonomy

Praunus flexuosus was the first mysidacean species ever to be formally described, when Otto Friedrich Müller described it under the name Cancer flexuosa in 1776.

Distribution and ecology
Praunus flexuosus lives along the coast of the north Atlantic Ocean between 40° north and 71° north, and in the Baltic Sea. There is only one doubtful record from further south than Roscoff. It is "the only documented non-native marine zooplankton species established on the East Coast [of North America]". It was first discovered in North America in 1960, on the north side of Cape Cod, and has since colonised as far north as Nova Scotia. This colonisation may have occurred after P. flexuosus was transported as a fouling animal on ships' hulls during the Second World War. It was only discovered around the coast of Iceland in 1970, but has since proved to be common along Iceland's south-west coast. This introduction may also have been facilitated by wartime convoys (see Battle of the Atlantic).

P. flexuosus can tolerate salinities of 2‰–33‰. It is often found on algae, and is most closely associated with the seaweed Fucus vesiculosus. It lives in shallow water, and is often found around artificial constructions, such as docks. It is an omnivore, feeding on debris and preying on small crustaceans, especially harpacticoid copepods, but consumes a greater proportion of macrozooplankton than other common littoral mysids, such as Neomysis integer and Praunus inermis. P. fleuosus is less gregarious than species such as N. integer. When it detects a predator nearby, using a combination of visual and chemical cues, P. flexuosus hides among vegetation.

Life cycle
Praunus flexuosus has two generations per year. A population overwinters, and produces a spring generation that appears in May or June, before dying off in the summer. Some of the spring generation reach sexual maturity and reproduce in the autumn, producing the generation which will reproduce the following spring. Females release eggs into a brood pouch or marsupium, where they are held until they hatch.

References

Mysida
Crustaceans of the Atlantic Ocean
Crustaceans described in 1776
Taxa named by Otto Friedrich Müller